Roseateles terrae is a Gram-negative, aerobic, oxidase- and catalase-positive bacterium with a single polar flagellum from the genus Roseateles, which was isolated from soil in Japan.

References

External links
Type strain of Roseateles terrae at BacDive -  the Bacterial Diversity Metadatabase

Comamonadaceae
Bacteria described in 2008